is a village located in Gunma Prefecture, Japan. , the village had an estimated population of 1,746 in 971 households, and a population density of 15 persons per km². Nanmoku, like many rural areas in Japan, is seeing a significant amount of population decline; in 1955 there were more than 10,000 inhabitants. The majority of the remaining villagers are over 60 years in age (57.1% in 2012), with a median age of 62.5 for the total population – the oldest in Japan.

Geography
Nanmoku is located in southwestern Gunma Prefecture bordering on Nagano Prefecture to the west. Part of the village is within the borders of the Myōgi-Arafune-Saku Kōgen Quasi-National Park.

 Mountains:
 Mount Arafune (1423 m)
 Mount Hikage (1407 m)
 Mount Ōya (1081 m)
 Eboshidake (1182 m)
 Mount Kurotaki (870 m)
 Mount Yotsumata (900 m)
 Tateiwa (1265 m)
 Rivers:
 Nanmoku River
 Ōshiozawa River
 Kumakura River
 Ōnita River

Surrounding municipalities
Gunma Prefecture
 Shimonita
 Kanna
Ueno
Nagano Prefecture
 Saku
 Sakuho

Climate
Nanmoku has a Humid continental climate (Köppen Cfa) characterized by warm summers and cold winters with heavy snowfall.  The average annual temperature in Nanmoku is 11.0 °C. The average annual rainfall is 1127 mm with September as the wettest month. The temperatures are highest on average in August, at around 24.0 °C, and lowest in January, at around -1.3 °C.

Demographics
Per Japanese census data, the population of Nanmoku peaked around the year 1950 and has decreased drastically since then.

History
During the Edo period, the area of present-day Nanmoku was largely part of the tenryō territory held directly by Tokugawa shogunate within Kōzuke Province. The area was divided into villages with the establishment of the modern municipalities system on April 1, 1889.  village of Nanmoku was created on March 15, 1955 by the merger of the villages of Iwado, Tsukigata and Ozawa.

Government
Nanmoku has a mayor-council form of government with a directly elected mayor and a unicameral village council of eight members. Nanmoku, together with the other municipalities in Kanra District contributes one member to the Gunma Prefectural Assembly. In terms of national politics, the town is part of Gunma 5th district of the lower house of the Diet of Japan.

Economy
The economy of Nanmoku is heavily dependent on agriculture.

Education
Nanmoku has a nursery school, elementary school, and middle school operated by the village government. The village does not have a high school.

Transportation

Railway
Nanmoku is not served by any passenger railway service. The nearest train station is Shimonita Station in the neighboring town of Shimonita.

Highway
Nanmoku is not served by any national highways.

Local attractions
Nanmoku is popular locally for its scenery. The village is located in the valley of a small mountain range, where there are excellent hiking opportunities. One of the mountains, Mt. Arahune, is home to a park with a campsite, including a large multipurpose recreational area that has tennis, water sports, and fishing facilities. There is also an astronomy center located on the grounds. Nanmoku also has a museum that documents local culture and history.

Many people who have moved away but still have family in the village return for this festival, and it is popular with tourists as well. Though such fire festivals were once popular, few remain. Nanmoku's version falls on August 14 and 15, and coincides with Obon, a festival honoring ancestors. However, Hitoboshi itself commemorates the village's victorious alliance with the Takeda clan during the Sengoku period. During the festival, villagers take turns standing on a bridge and twirling burning bales of hay over the edge.

References

External links

Official Website 

Villages in Gunma Prefecture
Nanmoku, Gunma